Fountain Creek is an unincorporated community in Fountain Creek Township, Iroquois County, Illinois, United States.

Geography
The site is located in the southeastern quarter of the township at the intersection of County Road 200 North and a Union Pacific railroad line.  The small waterway known as Fountain Creek runs less than half a mile west of the site and flows northeast toward Goodwine.

References

Unincorporated communities in Iroquois County, Illinois
Unincorporated communities in Illinois